The discography of Brian Eno, English electronic musician, music theorist and record producer, consists of 28 solo studio albums, 27 collaborative studio albums, 14 compilation albums, eight video albums, and nine singles.

Albums

Solo studio albums

Collaborative studio albums

Collaborative live albums

Remix albums

Compilation albums

EPs

Singles

Other appearances

Videography

Video albums

Music videos

Productions, mixes, and guest appearances

Executive producer

References

Sources

Notes

External links
 
 
 The Brian Eno discography at Hyperreal.org
 FACT Magazine, The Essential...Brian Eno critique of 10 albums

Discography
Discographies of British artists
Pop music discographies
Electronic music discographies
Production discographies